The South African Railways Class GK 2-6-2+2-6-2 of 1923 was an articulated steam locomotive from the New Cape Central Railway era.

In 1923, the New Cape Central Railway placed two Garratt articulated steam locomotives with a 2-6-2+2-6-2 Double Prairie type wheel arrangement in service. In 1925, when the New Cape Central Railway was amalgamated into the South African Railways, the two Garratts were renumbered and designated .

New Cape Central Railway
The New Cape Central Railway (NCCR) was an independent privately owned railway company who operated between Worcester and Mossel Bay. It was formed in January 1893 when it purchased all the assets of the bankrupted Cape Central Railway (CCR) who had constructed a railway from Worcester via Robertson to Roodewal.

In 1894, the NCCR began work to extend the railway to Swellendam. From there it continued via Heidelberg to Riversdale, which was reached on 3 December 1903. Voorbaai, outside Mossel Bay, was reached in 1906.

When the Cape Government Railways linked up with the NCCR at Mossel Bay on 23 September 1907, the NCCR undertook to operate the  section to George.

Unlike many other privately owned railways in South Africa, the NCCR prospered and was well and efficiently run. Prior to 1917 dividends were small, but from 1917 to 1925 dividends of 4½% were declared each year. The NCCR was the last component railway to be added to the South African Railways (SAR) when it was liquidated and amalgamated in May 1925. All the NCCR locomotives which came onto the SAR roster continued to give good service for many years.

Manufacturer
Increasing traffic and heavier loads led to the decision by the NCCR in 1922 to place an order with Beyer, Peacock and Company for two Garratt  Double Prairie type locomotives. The locomotives were built to the design of the Class GB of the SAR and were also superheated, with Belpaire fireboxes, plate frames, piston valves and Walschaerts valve gear, but they were heavier and had larger cylinders. They were delivered in 1923 and were initially numbered 12 and 13, but were later renumbered G1 and G2. The Garratts were the last new locomotives to be acquired by the company.

Service

New Cape Central Railway
In service on the NCCR, each Garratt could replace two of the railway’s older Class 7 locomotives, one  Garratt being able to do the work of altogether  worth of tender locomotives while saving  of coal and one crew's wages in the process. The Garratts eliminated the need to double-head passenger trains which often consisted of eight bogie carriages.

South African Railways
When the NCCR was amalgamated into the SAR in 1925, the two Garratt locomotives were renumbered 2340 and 2341 on the SAR roster and designated Class GK.

The locomotives were initially transferred to Cape Town and later joined the Class GD Garratts on the Overberg branch line to Caledon for a brief period. Since they were much lighter than the Class GD, they were less useful as traffic engines. They were then sent to Natal where they remained in service on the Donnybrook to Underberg branch until they were withdrawn from service by 1957.

Illustration

References

2460
Beyer, Peacock locomotives
2-6-2+2-6-2 locomotives
Garratt locomotives
Cape gauge railway locomotives
Railway locomotives introduced in 1923
1923 in South Africa
Scrapped locomotives